Richard Manu (born 20 January 1974) is a Ghanaian former professional footballer who played as a left-back.

Club career
Born in Ghana, Manu moved from Hamburg-based club Eimsbütteler TV to Borussia Neunkirchen in the 1996–97 season. In 2003, he left the club to join Eintracht Bad Kreuznach. A year later, he signed with TuRU Düsseldorf. In 2006, he moved to SC Halberg Brebach. He joined Asante Kotoko in October 2007 after training with the club during its training tour in Germany.

International career
Manu was a member of the Ghana national team. He was called up for the Black Stars for the game versus Mexico on 26 March 2008.

References

1974 births
Living people
Association football fullbacks
Ghanaian footballers
Ghana international footballers
Eimsbütteler TV players
Borussia Neunkirchen players
TuRU Düsseldorf players
Asante Kotoko S.C. players